The Association of Historians of Nineteenth-Century Art was formed in 1993. International in its scope, the organization provides a means for scholars of nineteenth-century art from around the world to share ideas and resources through a variety of venues including conferences sessions, a newsletter and a scholarly journal, Nineteenth-Century Art Worldwide.

Nineteenth-Century Art Worldwide was the first online, peer-reviewed journal devoted to the study of nineteenth-century art. This journal has been cited by organizations like the Carnegie Corporation as a model for the electronic dissemination of scholarship.

Officers

President: Peter Trippi
Vice President: Scott Allan 
Secretary: M. Franny Zawadzki
Treasurer: Andrew Eschelbacher
Membership Coordinator: Karen Pope
Program Chair: Patricia Mainardi
Newsletter Editor: Kimberly Musial Datchuk

At-Large Board Members

Marilyn Brown
Andre Dombrowski
Marc Gotlieb
James Housefield
Petra ten-Doesschate Chu (Executive Editor of NCAW)

References

External links
Association of Historians of Nineteenth-Century Art
Nineteenth-Century Art Worldwide - online journal

19th century in art